Secunderabad metro station may refer to:

 Secunderabad East metro station, on the Hyderabad Metro Blue Line
 Secunderabad West metro station, on the Hyderabad Metro Green Line